Fort William was a federal electoral district represented in the House of Commons of Canada from the year 1925 to 1979. It was located in the province of Ontario. This riding was created in 1924 from parts of Fort William and Rainy River riding.

It was initially defined to consist of the southern parts of the territorial districts of Rainy River, Kenora and Thunder Bay adjacent to the southern boundary of Canada.

In 1947, it was defined to consist of the city of Fort William and the southern parts of the territorial districts of Rainy River, Kenora and Thunder Bay adjacent to by the southern boundary of Canada.

In 1966, it was defined to consist of the City of Fort William and the Townships of Aldina, Blake, Crooks, Devon, Fraleigh, Gillies, Hartington, Lismore, Lybster, Marks, Neebing, O'Connor, Paipoonge, Pardee, Pearson, Scoble and Strange in the territorial district of Thunder Bay.

The electoral district was abolished in 1976 when it was merged into Thunder Bay—Atikokan riding.

History

S.C. 1924, c.63

Consisting of those parts of the territorial districts of Rainy River, Kenora and Thunder Bay bounded on the south by the southern boundary of Canada, and on the west, north and east by a line described as commencing on the said southern boundary at the intersection of the fifth meridian passing between the townships of Melgund and Revell; thence north along the said meridian to a point five miles north of the Canadian Pacific Railway; thence southeast parallel to and at a distance of five miles northerly from the said line of railway to a point five miles due north of the station of Poland, south to the said railway and continuing along the same to the intersection of the projection westerly to the north boundary of the township of Forbes; thence along the north and east boundaries of the said township, the north and east boundaries of the townships of Conmee and Oliver, and the north boundary of the townships of Paipoonge and Neebing, and their projection easterly to the eighty-ninth meridian; thence along the said meridian to the southern boundary of Canada.

S.C. 1933, c.54

Consisting of those parts of the territorial districts of Rainy River, Kenora and Thunder Bay bounded on the south by the southern boundary of Canada, on the west by the Fourth Meridan and on the north and east by a line described as commencing at a point on the said Fourth Meridian five miles north of the Canadian Pacific Railway; thence southeast parallel to and at a distance of five miles northerly from the said line of railway to a point five miles due north of the station of Poland; thence south to the said railway and continuing along the said railway to the intersection of the north boundary of the township of Goldie; thence along the north boundaries of the townships of Goldie and Forbes; thence south along the east boundaries of the townships of Forbes and Conmee; thence east and south along the north and east boundaries respectively of the township of Oliver; thence along the north boundaries of the townships of Paipoonge and Neebing and their projection easterly to the Eighty-ninth Meridian; thence south along the said meridian to the southern boundary of Canada.

S.C. 1947, c.71

Consisting of the city of Fort William and of those parts of the territorial districts of Rainy River, Kenora and Thunder Bay bounded on the south by the southern boundary of Canada; on the west by the Fourth Meridian; (excluding Atikokan Improvement District) and on the north and east by a line described as commencing at a point on the said Fourth Meridian five miles north of the Canadian Pacific Railway; thence southeast parallel to and at a distance of five miles northerly from the said line of railway to a point five miles due north of the former station of Poland, which was situated approximately at the intersection of the said railway line with the north boundary of the township of Fallis, five and one half miles westerly from Argon station; thence south to the said railway and continuing along the said railway to the intersection of the north boundary of the township of Goldie; thence along the north boundaries of the townships of Goldie and Forbes; thence south along the east boundaries of the townships of Forbes and Conmee; thence east and south along the north and east boundaries respectively of the township of Oliver;
thence along the north boundaries of the townships of Paipoonge and Neebing and their prolongation easterly to the Eighty-ninth Meridian of west longitude; thence south along the said Meridian to the southern boundary of Canada.

S.C. 1952, c.48

Consisting of the city of Fort William and of those parts of the territorial districts of Rainy River, Kenora and Thunder Bay bounded on the south by the southern boundary of Canada; on the west by the Fourth Meridian; (excluding Atikokan Improvement District) and on the north and east by a line described as commencing at a point on the said Fourth Meridian five miles north of the Canadian Pacific Railway; thence southeast parallel to and at a distance of five miles northerly from the said line of railway to a point five miles due north of the former station of Poland, which was situated approximately at the intersection of the said railway line with the north boundary of the township of Fallis, five and one half miles westerly from Argon station; thence south to the said railway and continuing along the said railway to the intersection of the north boundary of the township of Goldie;
thence along the north boundaries of the townships of Goldie and Forbes; thence south along the east boundaries of the townships of Forbes and Conmee; thence east and south along the north and east boundaries respectively of the township of Oliver; thence along the north boundaries of the townships of Paipoonge and Neebing and their prolongation easterly to the Eighty-ninth Meridian of west longitude; thence south along the said Meridian to the southern boundary of Canada.

Representation Order, 1966

Consisting of that part of the territorial district of Thunder Bay contained in the City of Fort William and the Townships of Aldina, Blake, Crooks, Devon, Fraleigh, Gillies, Hartington, Lismore, Lybster, Marks, Neebing, O'Connor, Paipoonge, Pardee, Pearson, Scoble and Strange.

Members of Parliament

This riding has elected the following Members of Parliament:

Election results

|}

|}

|}

On Mr. Manion being named Minister of Railways and Canals, 7 August 1930:

|}

|}

|}

|}

|}

|}

|}

|}

|}

|}

|}

|}

|}

|}

See also 
 List of Canadian federal electoral districts
 Past Canadian electoral districts

References

External links 
Riding history from the Library of Parliament

Former federal electoral districts of Ontario